Valery Petrovich Todorovsky (born 9 May 1962, in
Odessa) is a Russian film director, screenwriter, TV producer whose best known film is Hipsters (2008). He is the son of Pyotr Todorovsky.

Cinema 
Of his earlier films, The Hearse (Katafalk) won the Grand Prix at Mannheim (1990) and Love (Lyubov) received Ecumenical Prize at Cannes (1992), and won awards at Sozvezdie, Chicago, Geneva and       Montpellier Film Festivals.

Todorovsky made a name for himself with the crime melodrama set in Moscow, The Country of Deaf (Strana Glukhikh), scripted by actress-director-scriptwriter Renata Litvinova based on her own novella To Have and to Belong. The film was entered into the 48th Berlin International Film Festival in 1998.

In 1999 he was a member of the jury at the 21st Moscow International Film Festival.

His 2008 musical film Hipsters won the Golden Eagle Award and Nika Award for Best Film.

TV 

Valery Todorovsky also co-produced the Russian gangster TV series Brigada (2002) (which eventually received a cult popularity) and the 2005 TV adaptation of the Master and Margarita for Telekanal Rossiya.

In 2013, Russian TV main channel  "Channel 1" showed a serial The Thaw. It was Valeriy's debut on TV as a director. The ratings proved the serial was received with a great success. The serial is a melodrama about life in the Soviet Union during the early years of Nikita Khrushchev's era.

In 2022, The Russian streaming service More.tv showed the drama In two, directed by Todorovsky, and starring Alexander Petrov, Danila Kozlovsky and Irina Starshenbaum.

References

External links
 
 

1962 births
Living people
Russian film directors
20th-century Russian screenwriters
20th-century Russian male writers
Russian film producers
Male screenwriters
Russian male writers
Soviet film directors
Soviet screenwriters
Film people from Odesa
Odesa Jews
Russian people of Ukrainian descent
Gerasimov Institute of Cinematography alumni
Academicians of the National Academy of Motion Picture Arts and Sciences of Russia